The  is a Japanese company that manufactures plastic model kits of a variety of vehicles, including aircraft, cars, ships, military vehicles, model armor, model space craft, and science fiction kits. 

Based in Shizuoka, Hasegawa competes against its neighbor, Tamiya, though it does not have as large a line of products.

Primarily using polystyrene, Hasegawa kits are typically regarded as very accurate, but without quite the ease-of-assembly that Tamiya kits offer, though of very high standard nonetheless. Currently, Hasegawa kits are imported into North America by Hobbico's Great Planes Model Distributor division.  Hasegawa ended their long-time agreement with Dragon Models Limited for US distribution in early 2010. Hasegawa also imports Revell kits into Japan and sells them under both the Revell brand and its own brand label, and Revell frequently re-boxes Hasegawa kits for the European and North American markets.

Lacking their own lineup of paint products, Hasegawa kits come with instructions that specify the use of Gunze Sangyo products, most notably paints in the GSI Creos brand. This is in contrast to Tamiya, who specifies the use of its in-house brands.

Hasegawa is noted for releasing a large number of minor variations of their major products, often adding or modifying a small number of parts, or only changing the decals for the kit.  This strategy allows them to maximize their return on their investment in kit tooling quicker, as such minor variations cost little to produce compared to the cost of manufacturing the original.  Most such variations are usually only released once.

History
In 1941, the Hasegawa factory opened as a manufacturer of wooden teaching materials, such as a woodwork models. It entered into the plastic model field in 1961, with its first plastic model "glider" airplane models. In the following June 1962, the "1/450 battleship Yamato" was released after high development costs and became a success with about 150,000 units sold in the same year, and continuing success in the following years. The profitable line of 1/90 F-104 Starfighter and 1/70 P-51 Mustang model kits became the turning point which prompted Hasegawa to turn away from woodwork models and to plastic models completely.

Product Lines

1/12 Scale Automobiles

Hasegawa produced kits of at least two cars in this large scale: the Nissan 300ZX and the Mazda RX-7.

1/8 Scale Aircraft (Museum Series)

Since the mid-70's, Hasegawa has produced four kits in this series, museum quality skeleton models of early 20th century aircraft. The kits, of exceptional quality, use a variety of woods, metals, brass, plastic, rubber, and other materials. The kit issued are of the following aircraft:

the Fokker Dr.I

the Sopwith Camel

the Royal Aircraft Factory S.E.5

the Wright Flyer (1/16 scale).
 
With the initial Fokker DR.I harking back to Hasegawa's wooden kit days (see above), the kit has a wooden structure augmented by cast brass and molded plastic components. the kit was first introduced in the 1970s, and has seen sporadic re-issue since then.

The 1/8 Museum Series kits are highly sought after by collectors and enthusiasts, commanding high prices when sold as retail items, or when auctioned online.

In 2013 and 2014, Hasegawa has also released selected sub-assemblies from these kits as stand-alone models. Examples include the Rotary engines from the Fokker Dr.I and Sopwith Camel, and the Spandau and Lewis machine guns from these kits respectively.

1/24 Scale Automobiles

Hasegawa has found success in producing kits of subjects that were somewhat ignored by the larger model manufacturers. The quality of these kits can vary from very simple construction with few details, to those with very high fidelity, rivaling Tamiya or Revell's best efforts. Many kits include photo-etched parts, and some have been released as "Super Detail" versions, featuring additional photo-etched and white metal parts.

Hasegawa's automotive selection is made up of several categories, including:

Collection Disk featuring Mitsubishi Galants and Lancers, Subaru Legacys and Impreza WRXs, Honda Civics

Collection Rally featuring a wide selection of rally cars, spanning from the 1970s, such as the Lancia Stratos and Lancia 037 Rally, to modern World Rally Championship competitors, like the Subaru Impreza, Lancia Delta HF Integrale, and Ford Focus.

Collection Speed features various touring car race cars that competed in the Japanese Touring Car Championship in the mid-1990s, including Honda Civics, Toyota Corollas and BMW 3 Series in various liveries.

Historic Car featuring sports cars from the 1970s and older, including the Toyota 2000GT and Celica 1600GT, various versions of the Nissan Fairlady 240Z and Bluebird 510 (the latter in four-door sedan form, unusual for a plastic model car, as it was the most widely exported version of the 1:1), the Lamborghini Miura, as well as various kits of the Volkswagen Beetle and Microbus.

Historic Racing featuring winning cars from their respective events. Many of these are race versions of cars available in the Historic Car line. Examples include Toyota 2000GT "1967 Fuji 24 Hour Race Winner," Nissan Bluebird 1600 SSS "1970 Safari Rally Winner" and Datsun Fairlady 240Z "1971 Safari Rally Winner."

Military Vehicle featuring versions of the Willys MB Jeep and the Volkswagen  Kübelwagen.

Racing Car features various Group C race cars, including versions of the Jaguar XJR-8LM, the Porsche 962, the Sauber Mercedes C9 and the Toyota 88C, as well as various Formula 1 cars including the Ferrari 642, Benetton Ford B191B, and Williams Renault FW14B.

World Famous Car featuring various versions of the Jaguar XJ-S V12, the Ferrari 328 and 348 and the Porsche 944 and 968.

1/32 Scale Aircraft
Considered among the best in this scale as well, these kits depict mainly World War II fighter aircraft, with a few modern jets and a few oddities such as the Fieseler Fi 156 Storch military liaison plane. Notably, the Mitsubishi Zero A6M5 model was created under the supervision of Jiro Horikoshi, designer of the actual craft.

1/48 Scale Aircraft
Hasegawa was a latecomer to the field of 1/48 scale aircraft, and its efforts may be seen as a response to Tamiya's strong presence through the 1970s and 1980s.

The line consists of World War II and modern military aircraft, mostly fighters. In the 1980s a small line of 1/48 business jets was produced, but was discontinued.

1/72 Scale Aircraft
This has traditionally been Hasegawa's main product line, and that which the company is best known for. It consists almost entirely of World War II and modern military aircraft, primarily fighter and attack aircraft, with some larger bombers and multi-engined examples. At times the line has included kits manufactured by Frog and Monogram, as well as other minor specialty brands.

Hasegawa, like many of its competitors, produces a nearly complete lineup of Imperial Japanese Air Force and Navy types from World War II. Notably, the company's product line includes every variant of the Mitsubishi A6M Reisen Zero fighter. Among modern types, the company specialises in types found in the JASDF, to cater for local Japanese modellers. Hasegawa's kits of modern military aircraft are often considered by hobbyists the definitive kit of given types. Unlike most of its competitor's, Hasegawa's modern military aircraft are packaged with minimal weaponry.  Hasegawa produce a number of aircraft weapon sets which must be purchased separately.

Hasegawa often releases limited-run kits in this line (as well as 1/48) which feature special decal sets, often for timely subjects; examples include the Navy One S-3 Viking, and the F-4 Phantom, F-15J Eagle and F-2A Viper Zero kits representing the winners of the JASDF's annual gunnery competitions. Sometimes these reissues are of models that have been long discontinued, or include two kits in a single box. As such releases are aimed at connoisseur modelers, they are usually priced twice or even more as much as the corresponding standard kit.

Included in its selection are Science Fiction types, specifically of the Macross series Valkyrie transformable fighters, which are modelled in their jet-fighter forms (see below)

1/72 Scale Armor
Also called the "Minibox" series, this features military vehicles (mostly World War II, with a few modern) designed to be compatible with the 1/72 aircraft.
The series was released in the 1970s, and are still being produced today.

1/150 Scale Trolleys
Hasegawa sells ready-to-run model trolleys under the Modemo brand in 1:150 scale, of both Japanese and American prototypes.

1/200 Scale Aircraft
This line consists of airliners. The kits are somewhat simplified but go together well. They are known for their quality and ease of build. At the moment, Hasegawa is the only major manufacturer of 1/200 scale airliner model kits, with it being a common scale for ready built, snap-fit or diecast models. Hasegawa currently produces 1/200 models of the Boeing 747-200,787-8, 747-400, 777-200, 777-300, 767-300, 737-200, 737-500, 737-700, 737-800 and 727-200, as well as the McDonnell Douglas MD-90, MD-11, DC-10-40, DC-3, Lockheed L-1011, and Airbus A300. Models such as the Boeing 737-400, 747-100, 747-300, 767-200, McDonnell Douglas MD-80, DC-9, DC-10-30, Airbus A320, A321 have been made in the past.

Although Hasewaga has been licensed by international airline companies in the past, as of 2019, the brand produces Japanese airlines' models only, such as All Nippon Airways, Japan Airlines and Vanilla Air model airplanes.

1/350 Scale Ships

1/700 Scale Waterline Ships

Science Fiction Kits
Currently, this consists of spacecraft and mecha from the Macross and Ultraman television/film series, as well as subjects from the Virtual On video game franchise (especially Cyber Troopers Virtual-On Force and Marz Virtuaroids) and Maschinen Krieger universe.

Novelty Items
Though definitely not "true scale" models, Hasegawa also produces a line of small aircraft called Egg Planes. On the box they are described as "grade-A jumbo scale".
They feature an egg-shaped distorted interpretation of a real world aircraft, such as the P-51 mustang, SR-71 blackbird, and the Space Shuttle. The kits have a relatively low parts count and are designed to provide recreational enjoyment.
These kits were first introduced in Easter 1972 (Air Enthusiast, section Model Enthusiast, April 1972), and their range was limited to the first three models discussed above. In the 1980s, 1990's and 2000's, Hasegawa has increased the range to mirror successful models in their more formal scale model ranges in 1:72. Subjects today include a wider range of World War II fighters, modern combat aircraft, helicopters, and even Macross Valkyries.

References

External links
  

 Examplar build of 1/8 Sopwith Camel Museum Model

Model manufacturers of Japan
Companies based in Shizuoka Prefecture
Japanese brands